Pennsylvania's 35th congressional district was one of Pennsylvania's districts of the United States House of Representatives.

Geography
District boundaries eventually set to cover parts of Allegheny County, Pennsylvania, near Pittsburgh, Pennsylvania.

List of members representing the district

References

 Congressional Biographical Directory of the United States 1774–present

35
Former congressional districts of the United States
1923 establishments in Pennsylvania
1933 disestablishments in Pennsylvania
Constituencies established in 1923
Constituencies disestablished in 1933